François Philippe Louis Hyacinthe Joseph de Haussy (3 July 1789 – 19 October 1869) was a Belgian businessman, liberal politician and civil servant. He was Belgian minister of justice from 1847 until 1850.

He was appointed as the first governor of the newly founded National Bank of Belgium by king Leopold I of Belgium and Walthère Frère-Orban in 1850. He remained in office until 1869.

He was born in Mons and died in Brussels aged 80.

Sources
 François-Philippe de Haussy

1789 births
1869 deaths
Belgian politicians
19th-century Belgian civil servants
Governors of the National Bank of Belgium